USS F-3 (SS-22), was a F-class submarine. She was named Pickerel when her keel was laid down by The Moran Company of Seattle, Washington, making her the first ship of the United States Navy to be named for the pickerel, a type of pike.  She was renamed F-3 on 17 November 1911, launched on 6 January 1912 sponsored by Mrs. M. F. Backus, and commissioned on 5 August 1912.

Service history
F-3 completed her trials in the Puget Sound area before reporting for duty at San Francisco, California on 15 October 1912, when she joined the First Submarine Group, Pacific Torpedo Flotilla. The Flotilla operated along the coast of California, conducting constant exercises and experiments to develop the techniques of submarine warfare, and from August 1914 to November 1915, carried out similar operations in the Hawaiian Islands out of Naval Submarine Base Pearl Harbor. F-3 was placed in ordinary at Mare Island on 15 March 1916, returning to full commission on 13 June 1917.

After training her new crew, F-3 was assigned to the Coast Torpedo Force, Pacific Fleet, based at San Pedro, California's San Pedro Submarine Base. She engaged in daily operations, surfaced and submerged, training students of the submarine school. During maneuvers on 17 December 1917, she and  collided, the latter sinking almost immediately. F-3, along with other submarines with whom she was operating, rescued only 3 men out of the 22 on board the F-1. F-3 suffered a cracked bow cap and after repairs at Mare Island was assigned operations in cooperation with a civilian motion picture company in experiments with underwater photography. From 1919-1921, F-3 served at San Pedro, California as training ship, and on 15 March 1922 she was decommissioned. She was sold on 17 August 1922.

References

External links

Ships built in Seattle
1912 ships
F-3
World War I submarines of the United States
United States submarine accidents
Maritime incidents in 1917